Pierre Flor (25 September 1775 – 8 April 1848) was a Norwegian politician, editor and military officer.

Pierre Poumeau Flor was born at the Lilleaker farm in Vestre Aker, Norway. He was the son of General War Commissioner Jens Lorentz Flor (1730-1806) and Maria Bolette Heegård (1752-1787). His father later bought Haugbu farm  in Asker in Akershus and settled his family there. Flor completed his legal examination in 1792. He subsequently acted as an assistant to his father as a military auditor. In 1797, he served with the Asker Regiment (Akershusiske infanteriregiments)  and in 1799 was a  second lieutenant with the Vestre Laurvig Company (Vestre Laurvigske kompani).

From 1806 to 1811, he managed the family farm at Asker. In 1816, he formed the newspaper Drammens Tidende together with Søren Tybring who was vicar of Bragernes Church in Drammen. He served as  co-editor until 1817.

Flor was elected a member of Norwegian Parliament from Drammen during the sessions  1818-20, 1821–23 and 1824-26. He served as an alternate  representative 1842-44.

References

1775 births
1848 deaths
19th-century Norwegian politicians
Norwegian Army personnel
Norwegian military personnel of the Napoleonic Wars
Norwegian newspaper people
Politicians from Drammen